The 2018 Marburg Open was a professional tennis tournament played on clay courts. It was the ninth edition of the tournament which was part of the 2018 ATP Challenger Tour. It took place in Marburg, Germany between 2 and 8 July 2018.

Singles main-draw entrants

Seeds

 1 Rankings are as of 25 June 2018.

Other entrants
The following players received wildcards into the singles main draw:
  Benjamin Hassan
  Julian Lenz
  Rudolf Molleker
  Mats Rosenkranz

The following player received entry into the singles main draw as a special exempt:
  Gianluca Mager

The following players received entry from the qualifying draw:
  Thomaz Bellucci
  Elliot Benchetrit
  Dragoș Dima
  Tristan Lamasine

Champions

Singles

  Juan Ignacio Londero def.  Hugo Dellien 3–6, 7–5, 6–4.

Doubles

  Fabrício Neis /  David Vega Hernández def.  Henri Laaksonen /  Luca Margaroli 4–6, 6–4, [10–8].

External links
Official Website

2018 ATP Challenger Tour
2018
2018 in German tennis